Martin 'Marty' Reynolds (born February 8, 1950) is a Wisconsin politician and legislator.

Born in Ladysmith, Wisconsin, Reynolds served in the United States Air Force and was a plumbing contractor. He served as mayor of Ladysmith. In 1990, Reynolds, a Democrat, was elected to the Wisconsin State Assembly. Reynolds served in the Wisconsin State Assembly from 1991 until 2003, when he ran for Lieutenant Governor of Wisconsin with Ed Thompson on the Libertarian Party ticket in the 2002 Wisconsin Gubernatorial Election.

Notes

People from Ladysmith, Wisconsin
Mayors of places in Wisconsin
Members of the Wisconsin State Assembly
Military personnel from Wisconsin
1950 births
Living people